The Low Floor Series (LFS) is a series of transit buses manufactured by Nova Bus for North American customers from 1996 to the present. It is produced in 40' rigid and 62' articulated (nominal) lengths with a variety of powertrains, including conventionally-fueled (diesel and natural gas), hybrid diesel-electric, and battery-electric. The LFS is the first transit bus designed by Nova Bus.

History

Development
After taking over the former GM bus plant in Saint-Eustache, Quebec from Motor Coach Industries (MCI) in 1993, Yvon Lafortune, who had previously headed the Venus automotive project for Bombardier Inc., was named president of Nova Bus.

Nova Bus management was invited by the Quebec government to design and produce a low-floor bus similar to the style popular in the European market. The limited engineering staff that was acquired by Nova Bus along with the bus plant had never before designed a complete bus; the Classic that was still being produced at the time of acquisition was an updated version of the GM New Look bus, which had been designed by General Motors in the late 1950s. After sixteen months of negotiations, nine transit agencies in Quebec placed a final order of 330 Classic buses plus 60 low-floor buses to be delivered at the end of the contract.

Because low-floor buses were uncommon in North America, Nova Bus signed a technology transfer agreement to adapt the Dutch low-floor  bus. A demonstration  Alliance City bus and engineering staff were sent from the Netherlands; however, by 1994 Den Oudsten was in financial trouble, eventually declaring bankruptcy in 2001. Den Oudsten was unable to collaborate further with Nova Bus after sending the City Alliance, and Nova Bus then had to design a low-floor bus alone to meet the challenging North American standard "white book" specifications. The New Look-derived Classic used a riveted structure, and the Den Oudsten bus used a welded tubular spaceframe, which required Nova Bus to set up a separate factory to manufacture frames in Saint-François-du-Lac.

Louis Côté was hired as the head of body design. Industrial designer Jean Labbé, who had also worked on the Bombardier Venus, was recruited by Lafortune to design the exterior and layout of the LFS. Labbé deliberately chose automobile-like styling which he intended to be "friendly, and a little naive" with "eyes wide open" and a signature triple-oval "nostril" feature centred under the windshield. Côté modified the design to use an off-the-shelf bumper, as the custom bumper specified by Labbé was thought to be too expensive.

The first LFS prototype was shown at the triennial fall 1994 American Public Transportation Association show in Boston; to meet that deadline, design and fabrication teams worked around the clock. Two prototypes were eventually produced, with one exhibited at APTA '94 in Boston, and the other sent to Altoona for testing. It was the second low-floor bus to be offered in North America, following the New Flyer Low Floor series, which had been introduced in 1991. 

In parallel, Detroit Diesel had announced that in 1994, they would begin to wind down production of the Series 71 and Series 92 two-stroke diesel engines which had powered most North American transit buses since the 1950s; the two stroke technology could not be modified to comply with new US EPA regulations, and production ceased in 1998. While Nova Bus's initial plan was to introduce the low-floor LFS as an alternative to the lower cost Classic, keeping both in production, the initial release of the Cummins-powered Classic "T-Drive" in 1995 was underdeveloped and plagued with severe reliability problems. A decision was made to concentrate development resources on the new LFS and to discontinue the Classic as soon as the LFS was in full production.

Production
Further development postponed production until 1996. Initially, Nova Bus planned to produce a prototype pilot fleet of 80 LFS buses for evaluation in revenue service by four major Quebec transit properties; the resulting reliability and service data would be used to further refine the design before entering serial production. These plans were canceled by the discontinuation of the Detroit Diesel engines, loss of the Den Oudsten partnership, and trouble-plagued Classic T-Drive launch, and the LFS was pressed into production.

By the time the first LFS (delivered to STCUM as 16-004) entered revenue service at the end of 1996, about 400 LFS were already built, awaiting acceptance from the same Quebec properties. These early LFS were also plagued with reliability and serviceability problems, receiving 2,500 complaints during the first eighteen months of service; but unlike the Cummins-powered Classics, the problems were throughout the bus and not concentrated on the drivetrain.

Because the Den Oudsten bus from which it was derived had an option for a third passenger door, the engine compartment of the first generation LFS was displaced towards the driver's side, even though no agency took the third door option on the LFS. In addition, the reduced offset engine space meant that a smaller Cummins engine was fitted, leading some transit agencies to immediately disqualify the LFS from purchase. Frame material was switched to stainless steel in 1998 for the second generation due to premature corrosion of the early LFS buses; of the 451 that had been delivered to STCUM, 400 were scrapped before their mandated 16-year lifetime.

An interest in Nova Bus was acquired by Volvo Buses in 1997; Volvo took full control in 2004, leading to the third generation, which moved the engine to the centreline of the bus and dropped the option for the third door.

To meet 'Buy American' requirements for the United States market, LFS buses were assembled for the Chicago Transit Authority (and other transit agencies) in a plant in Niskayuna, New York until that plant closed in 2002 and NovaBus withdrew to concentrate on the Canadian market. It re-entered the United States market in 2009 after opening a new plant in Plattsburgh, New York. The Chicago order, placed in 1998, was the first major US win for Nova Bus, with more than 400 LFS buses delivered.

By 2019, 12,500 LFS buses had been produced to 125 operators; annual production is approximately 1000 LFS buses per year, and Nova Bus has captured nearly 70% of the Canadian market.

Models
The current LF is offered in several transit bus variants:

LFS Shuttle and LFS Suburban are additional variants outside of the regular transit bus products offered. The LFS Shuttle and the LFS Suburban have some features from commuter coaches, with all forward-facing seats and no rear exit. In addition, Nova Bus was working on an electric variant with multiple power source options, which came out in 2019 as the LFSe+.

Variants

Generations
The LFS began production in 1995 and has since expanded to the current model range.

Gallery

See also

Competitive models:
Gillig Low Floor (40')
NABI 42-BRT & 60-BRT (40' and 60')
NABI 40-LFW & 60-LFW (40' and 60')
Neoplan AN440L (40')
New Flyer Low Floor (40' and 60')
New Flyer Xcelsior (40' and 60')
Orion VII (07.501)
Previous models:
Rapid Transit Series - the predecessor to the LFS.

References

External links

 LFS
 LFS HEV
 LFS Articulated
 LFX
 LFS Smartbus
 Transit Toronto - NovaBUS

Altoona tests
 
 
 
 
 
 
 
 
 

Buses of Canada
Buses of the United States
Low-floor buses
Articulated buses
Hybrid electric buses
Vehicles introduced in 1995
Cab over vehicles
Battery electric buses